Rodrigo Damm (born 3 February 1980) is a Brazilian retired professional mixed martial artist who last competed in the Lightweight division of the UFC. A professional since 2004, he also competed for World Victory Road, Strikeforce, Jungle Fight, Shooto, and was a competitor on The Ultimate Fighter: Brazil.

Background
Damm began training in Brazilian jiu-jitsu when he was 16 years old, and also competed in wrestling. He is a seven-time national champion in both sports as well as a world champion in Brazilian jiu-jitsu.

Mixed martial arts career

Early career
Damm made his professional mixed martial arts debut in October 2004, losing via split decision to Luciano Azevedo. In the years following that loss, he went on an 8 fight win streak while fighting all over the world including Japan, Russia and South Korea.

Strikeforce
Damm made his United States MMA debut at Strikeforce: Shamrock vs. Diaz against Gilbert Melendez for the Strikeforce Interim Lightweight Championship.

Damm returned to the promotion in 2011, where he faced Justin Wilcox in the main event at Strikeforce Challengers: Wilcox vs. Damm.  He lost the fight via doctor stoppage between the first and second round due to a cut.

The Ultimate Fighter
In March 2012, Damm appeared as a fighter on The Ultimate Fighter: Brazil.  In the opening elimination fight, he defeated Fabrício Guerreiro by submission (rear naked choke) in round 2 to get into the TUF house.

Damm was selected fourth (eighth overall) by Vitor Belfort to be a part of Team Vitor. During the show, Damm often came to blows with Anistavio "Gasparzinho" Medeiros, as Gasparzinho's prankster attitude constantly annoyed the more serious Damm.  In the quarterfinals, Damm was matched up against undefeated John Teixeira. After three closely contested rounds, Damm won via split decision.

Ultimate Fighting Championship
Damm made his UFC debut at UFC 147 on 23 June 2012 where he faced his rival from the TUF, Gasparzinho.  He won the fight via submission in the first round, earning a Submission of the Night bonus in the process.

Damm fought Antonio Carvalho on 17 November 2012 at UFC 154. Damm lost a back and forth fight via split decision.

Damm next fought Mizuto Hirota at UFC on Fuel TV 10 on 8 June 2013. He won the back-and-forth fight via split decision.

Damm was expected to face Hacran Dias at UFC Fight Night 29.  However, the bout was scrapped just days prior to the event after Damm was sidelined due to a kidney stone attack.

Damm moved back to Lightweight and faced Ivan Jorge on 15 February 2014 at UFC Fight Night 36. He won the fight via unanimous decision.

Damm faced Rashid Magomedov on 31 May 2014 at The Ultimate Fighter Brazil 3 Finale He lost the fight via unanimous decision.

Damm faced Al Iaquinta at UFC Fight Night 50 on 5 September 2014.  Iaquinta defeated Damm via third-round TKO.

Damm faced Evan Dunham on 3 January 2015 at UFC 182. He lost the fight by unanimous decision and was subsequently released from the promotion.

Following his release, Damm posted this statement to social media.

"I stopped, retired from MMA. I'm not training hard enough for quite some time. I go to my BJJ gym two or three times a week, when I can. I keep training but for my own pleasure. I'm enjoying my family. I spent a lot of time away from home and traveling, now I can watch my kids grow up. I think I'm gonna start doing business with my dad at his woodshop. This should be my future"

Personal life
Rodrigo's sister Carina Damm is also a mixed martial artist.

Championships and accomplishments

Mixed martial arts
Ultimate Fighting Championship
Submission of the Night (One time)

Mixed martial arts record

|-
| Loss
| align=center| 12–9
| Evan Dunham
| Decision (unanimous)
| UFC 182
| 
| align=center| 3
| align=center| 5:00
| Las Vegas, Nevada, United States
| 
|-
| Loss
| align=center| 12–8
| Al Iaquinta
| TKO (punches and elbows)
| UFC Fight Night: Jacare vs. Mousasi
| 
| align=center| 3
| align=center| 2:26
| Mashantucket, Connecticut, United States
| 
|-
| Loss
| align=center| 12–7
| Rashid Magomedov
| Decision (unanimous)
| The Ultimate Fighter Brazil 3 Finale: Miocic vs. Maldonado
| 
| align=center| 3
| align=center| 5:00
| São Paulo, Brazil
| 
|-
| Win
| align=center| 12–6
| Ivan Jorge
| Decision (unanimous)
| UFC Fight Night: Machida vs. Mousasi
| 
| align=center| 3
| align=center| 5:00
| Jaraguá do Sul, Brazil
| 
|-
| Win
| align=center| 11–6
| Mizuto Hirota
| Decision (split)
| UFC on Fuel TV: Nogueira vs. Werdum
| 
| align=center| 3
| align=center| 5:00
| Fortaleza, Brazil
| 
|-
| Loss
| align=center| 10–6
| Antonio Carvalho
| Decision (split)
| UFC 154
| 
| align=center| 3
| align=center| 5:00
| Montreal, Quebec, Canada
| 
|-
| Win
| align=center| 10–5
| Anistavio Medeiros
| Submission (rear-naked choke)
| UFC 147
| 
| align=center| 1
| align=center| 2:12
| Belo Horizonte, Brazil
| 
|-
| Loss
| align=center| 9–5
| Justin Wilcox
| TKO (doctor stoppage)
| Strikeforce Challengers: Wilcox vs. Damm
| 
| align=center| 1
| align=center| 5:00
| Stockton, California, United States
| 
|-
| Loss
| align=center| 9–4
| Maximo Blanco
| TKO (punches)
| World Victory Road Presents: Sengoku Raiden Championships 13
| 
| align=center| 2
| align=center| 0:45
| Tokyo, Japan
| 
|-
| Win
| align=center| 9–3
| Ivan Iberico
| Decision (unanimous) 
| Jungle Fight 17: Vila Velha
| 
| align=center| 3
| align=center| 5:00
| Vila Velha, Brazil
| 
|-
| Loss
| align=center| 8–3
| Gilbert Melendez
| KO (punches)
| Strikeforce: Shamrock vs. Diaz
| 
| align=center| 2
| align=center| 2:02
| San Jose, California, United States
| 
|-
| Loss
| align=center| 8–2
| Eiji Mitsuoka
| Submission (rear-naked choke) 
| World Victory Road Presents: Sengoku 4
| 
| align=center| 1
| align=center| 3:13
| Saitama, Japan
| 
|-
| Win
| align=center| 8–1
| Jorge Masvidal
| TKO (punch)
| World Victory Road Presents: Sengoku 3
| 
| align=center| 2
| align=center| 4:38
| Saitama, Japan
| 
|-
| Win
| align=center| 7–1
| Johil de Oliveira
| Decision
| Universidade Fight Show 1
| 
| align=center| 3
| align=center| 5:00
| Espirito Santo, Brazil
| 
|-
| Win
| align=center| 6–1
| Ryan Bow
| KO (punches)
| BodogFIGHT: Vancouver
| 
| align=center| 2
| align=center| 1:03
| Vancouver, British Columbia, Canada
| 
|-
| Win
| align=center| 5–1
| Santino DeFranco
| Submission (rear-naked choke) 
| BodogFIGHT Series II: Clash of the Nations
| 
| align=center| 2
| align=center| 1:58
| Saint Petersburg, Russia
| 
|-
| Win
| align=center| 4–1
| Kultar Gill 
| Submission (rear-naked choke)	 
| BodogFIGHT: Clash of the Nations I
| 
| align=center| 2
| align=center| 2:11
| Saint Petersburg, Russia
| 
|-
| Win
| align=center| 3–1
| Naoki Seki
| Submission (armbar)
| MARS 4: New Deal
| 
| align=center| 1
| align=center| 1:48
| Tokyo, Japan
| 
|-
| Win
| align=center| 2–1
| Jyu Do Fan
| Submission (rear-naked choke)
| MARS Attack 1
| 
| align=center| 1
| align=center| 3:56
| Seoul, South Korea
| 
|-
| Win
| align=center| 1–1
| Luciano Silva
| Submission (rear-naked choke)
| Night of Fight 1
| 
| align=center| 1
| align=center| 1:26
| Vila Velha, Brazil
| 
|-
| Loss
| align=center| 0–1
| Luciano Azevedo
| Decision (split)
| Shooto Brazil: Never Shake
| 
| align=center| 2
| align=center| 5:00
| São Paulo, Brazil
|

Mixed martial arts exhibition record

|-
| Win
| align=center| 2–0
| John Macapá
| Decision (split)
| The Ultimate Fighter: Brazil
| align=center| 
| align=center| 3
| align=center| 5:00
| Brazil
| 
|-
| Win
| align=center| 1–0
| Fabrício Guerreiro 
| Submission (rear-naked choke)
| The Ultimate Fighter: Brazil
| align=center| 
| align=center| 2
| align=center| N/A
| Brazil
|

References

External links
 
 

1980 births
Living people
Brazilian male mixed martial artists
Brazilian male sport wrestlers
Brazilian practitioners of Brazilian jiu-jitsu
Lightweight mixed martial artists
Welterweight mixed martial artists
Mixed martial artists utilizing wrestling
Mixed martial artists utilizing Brazilian jiu-jitsu
Ultimate Fighting Championship male fighters
Brazilian people of German descent
People from Vila Velha
People awarded a black belt in Brazilian jiu-jitsu
Sportspeople from Espírito Santo